The Stormont Vail Events Center, formerly known as Kansas Expocentre, is a 10,000-seat multi-purpose arena built in 1987 in Topeka, Kansas. Previously, the Topeka Sizzlers of the Continental Basketball Association, Kansas Koyotes indoor football team,Topeka Tarantulas, Topeka ScareCrows, Topeka Pilots ice hockey and Topeka Tropics of Champions Indoor Football teams played there. Many other shows, including concerts, perform here.

The Kansas Expocentre was renamed on June 13, 2019, to the Stormont Vail Events Center after signing a ten-year partnership agreement with Topeka-based Stormont Vail Health.

It has hosted the Kansas State High School Activities Association Class 5A boys and girls state basketball tournaments since its opening, and the KSHSAA Class 5A and 6A volleyball state championships since 1992. The arena also hosts the USA Wrestling Kansas Kids state championship tournament every March.

Landon Arena is the main part of the events center. Other areas include the Exhibition Hall, a building for trade shows, and Domer Arena, a livestock/horse show arena.

Features
Landon Arena contains 7,450 fixed seats, with over 2,550 floor seats. The arena is climate controlled and features computerized lighting, closed circuit TV security, a state-of-the-art sound system,  drive-in entrance, plenty of power, and built-in ice capabilities.

History
The  site in the center of Topeka has a long history of use for activities related to agriculture, farming, exhibitions, education and entertainment as the Shawnee County Fairgrounds. The grand opening of the Kansas Expocentre was on April 17, 1987, with a sold-out concert featuring Kenny Rogers, T. Graham Brown, and Ronnie Milsap.

Landon Arena, named for Kansas' elder statesman, governor Alfred M. Landon (1887–1987) was built 1987. To tie the old buildings to the new facilities, an indoor passageway was constructed between the conference center and exhibit hall. It hosted the first Expocentre event with nearly 9,000 people attending a Topeka Sizzlers basketball game.

Significant events
Landon Arena has been the venue for many concerts, family shows, trade shows, consumer shows, horse shows, dog shows and a variety of exhibitions.
Concert performers have included George Strait, Garth Brooks, KISS, Bob Dylan, My Chemical Romance, Aerosmith, Heart, Rush, Primus, Cher, Rise Against, Alice Cooper, Carrie Underwood, Little Big Town, Avenged Sevenfold, Buckcherry, Papa Roach, Marilyn Manson, Rob Zombie, Eric Church, and Kansas.
It has also hosted some wrestling shows such as WCW, WWE Raw, ECW, WWE Friday Night SmackDown, and Total Nonstop Action Wrestling house shows.
Ice shows include Disney on Ice and High School Musical: The Concert Tour.
Other Disney shows include Disney Live, Winnie the Pooh, Playhouse Disney Live, and My Little Pony Live.
The arena also hosts the Arab Shrine Circus each year.

References

External links
Landon Arena official site

Buildings and structures completed in 1987
Buildings and structures in Topeka, Kansas
Indoor ice hockey venues in the United States
Music venues in Kansas
Sports venues in Kansas
Tourist attractions in Topeka, Kansas
1987 establishments in Kansas
Continental Basketball Association venues
Indoor arenas in Kansas